Columbia Hall, also known as NEHBS #HW04-056, is an historic building located in Dannebrog, Nebraska, United States that was built in 1908. It was listed on the National Register of Historic Places on July 22, 2005. The building was built by the Danish Brotherhood in America to serve as a meeting hall for the Danish community and the building currently serves as a tourist center and hosts an archive on Danish American history.

See also
 Danish Brotherhood in America

References

External links
 Dannebrog tourism information page

Danish Brotherhood in America
Danish-American culture in Nebraska
Clubhouses on the National Register of Historic Places in Nebraska
Buildings and structures in Howard County, Nebraska
Buildings and structures completed in 1908
National Register of Historic Places in Howard County, Nebraska
1908 establishments in Nebraska